This is a list of airports in Palestine, grouped by type and sorted by location. There are no currently active airports in Palestine.

Airports

See also
 List of airlines registered with the Palestinian National Authority

External links
CIA World fact Book

References

 Maurer, Maurer. Air Force Combat Units of World War II. Maxwell AFB, Alabama: Office of Air Force History, 1983. .
 

State of Palestine
 
Airports
State of Palestine